Matusow or Matusov is a surname of Russian origin. Notable people with this surname include:

Harvey Matusow, (1926-2002), informant for the FBI during the McCarthy era, author of False Witness 
Mike Matusow (1968), American professional poker player
Naomi C. Matusow (born 1938), New York politician